Jean-Baptiste Denys (1643 – 3 October 1704) was a French physician notable for having performed the first fully documented human blood transfusion, a xenotransfusion. He studied in Montpellier and was the personal physician to King Louis XIV.

Early life 
Jean Baptiste Denys was born in the 1630s, although his birth had gone unnoticed and undocumented. He was born in a family of modest means, in fact, his father was an artisan who specialized in water pumps, which was seeing an increase in popularity with new elaborate systems being introduced. The passion of Denys towards Medicine was also induced by his medical condition, in fact, he suffered from Asthma.

Education 
Despite his family's humble origins, he obtained a bachelor in theology at the College des Grassins and a medical degree at the Faculty of Medicine in Montpellier, when barely thirty. Denys’ ambition drew him to attempt a career in Paris, however, the bad reputation and its location made him an outsider to the Parisian moneyed scientific elite.

In Paris, he settled among the medical students in the Latin Quarter, to whom he would give anatomy lessons, encouraging the same hands-on approach of the Renaissance anatomist Andreas Vesalius. The lectures provided him with little income, but he gave them in an effort to establish important relationships with the Paris medical community.

General Context 
The years between 1667 and 1668 were characterized by the growing frenzy over the possibility of blood transfusion.

The French and English were the main contestants in the battle to master blood's secrets and perform the first successful human blood transfusion. Members of the British Royal Society began by injecting doses of fluids into the veins of animals, proceeding with dog-to-dog transfusion. Similarly, the French Academy of Science tried canine experiments, but was unable to replicate the English success.

The general context of the time regarding blood transfusion, had Denys paid particular attention to the English successes that were taking place, and to which he would read about on the French Journal des Sçavans, which would translate articles written by Henri Oldenburg on the topic, originally published on the english Philosophical Transaction.

Attempts at Blood Transfusion 
Denys started a collaboration with the barber-surgeon Paul Emmerez (?-1690), to undertake blood transfusion, as there were announcements of the progress the English were making regarding the topic, so much so that, during one of his dissection, he shared with his students his belief that transfusion was the ‘new and completely convincing proof’ of the truth of circulation, who in contrast degraded him.

The first recorded case of Denys' initial attempt at transfusion was between two small dogs, whom he intended to keep both alive, in contrast to the results obtained by the English. Although there was no real way to know if the recipient subject was effectively receiving blood as with the donor having blood removed, supposedly about nine ounces had been removed from the first and donated by the latter. According to his writings, one of the dogs suddenly weakened measurably, so much so that they stopped the experiment and began stitching up the dogs. One remained weak while the other maintained a more energetic and alert character, although Denys did note that the dog was not as ‘awake and gay’ as earlier. The physician then performed a sort of ‘control experiment’ with a third dog, of similar characteristics with those prior, to be assured that the effects recorded, regarding eye movement, food consumed and the weights of the subjects, were similar among them all and not due to other elements.

Denys soon realized that blood transfusion represented the ticket to success all around Europe and to finally gain recognition in the Parisian elite. On March 9, 1667 he announced on the Journal des sçavans his intention to move his anatomical and experimental demonstrations regarding the potential of blood transfusion as a therapeutic tool to the public, basically establishing himself as the primary transfusionist of France, thus going against both the ideals of the Academy of Sciences of the Paris, Faculty of Medicine and those of Charles Perrault.

Denys later moved his research to the private academy established by Henri Louis Habert de Montmor, who had seen in the physician an opportunity to take on both the English and the conservative French Academy of Sciences, established by Louis XIV, and consequently gain his own glory. Denys and Emmerez, with the new funds and supplies, progressed their experiments on dogs with various techniques and points of transfusion, they regarded them all as successful, as of the nineteen dogs recorded, none died. They also focused on interspecies transfusion, specifically in early April 1667 they started transfusions between calves and dogs, then moving on to sheep, cows, horses, and goats.

Denys would go on to announce his successes to all the European scientific community through written reports submitted to the Journal des sçavans, which enabled him to start a correspondence with Henry Oldenburg, and consequently the Philosophical Transaction. The transfusionist, although, omitted to credit the works done by English scientists, leading to many conflicts. He knew that the next step was that of initiating a radical new procedure between humans and animals, utilizing as a prime example the lamb, the symbol of the blood of Christ, hence the purest form.

Human Attempts 
Denys administered the first full documented xenotransfusion on June 15, 1667. With the assistance of Paul Emmerez he transfused about twelve ounces of lamb blood into the veins of a 15-year-old boy who had suffered from uncontrollable fevers for two months and had been consequently bled with leeches 20 times by a barber-surgeon, to no effect. After Denys’ intervention, allegedly, by the next morning, the kid was alert, and seemingly cured of his illness.

The physician, always with Emmerez by his side, performed another transfusion on a middle-aged man, a butcher, with pleasing results. The man had not died but rather was found to be in great spirit, although probably a consequence of the fact that the man later in the day went to the local tavern. Realistically, both instances of success were most likely due to the small amount of blood that was actually transfused into these people, which did not trigger any major allergic reaction.

Antoine Mauroy 
It is uncertain where initial interest for Antoine Mauroy, the infamous madman of Paris derived from, it is known that it happened after Denis started working with Montmor, probably as a consequence of the competition happening with both the king's nascent Academy of Sciences and traditionalist Faculty of Medicine.

Sometime in November 1667, Mauroy was abducted from the streets of Paris by Montmor's guard and tied to a chair and transfused with blood in front of an audience of noblemen. In the hours following the procedure, Mauroy experienced a debilitating fever, nausea, diarrhea, nosebleeds, and urine that was as black as ‘chimney soot’, fever, tachycardia, and abundant sweating. Just days later, the man had apparently fully recovered. This was the final proof for Denys, who right after publicizing his success, firstly by writing to Oldenburg, who published the letters received on the February 10, 1668 edition of the Philosophical Transactions (original and translated).

Mauroy and his wife eventually returned to their modest home, but Perrine soon found out that her husband's newfound calmness was temporary, only two months. The man's state of health and mind changed abruptly due to his binges of wine, tobacco, and ‘strong waters’ (alcohol). The man's madness was worse than before.

Denys performed a second transfusion which diminished the delirium but induced other major side effects. The third and last transfusion performed on Mauroy happened under major pressure of the wife, in fact, Denys was against it. During the procedure Mauroy's body, at a certain point, shook in a ‘violent fit’ to which the men decided to end the transfusion. Mauroy died the next day.

Recalling the various details of the transfusion it was clear that the cause of death had not been the transfusion, since no blood had actually been transfused into Mauroy and the calf had not yet been open when the seizures started. Denys and Emmerez tried to perform an autopsy but they were strongly opposed by the wife.

The Trial 
Following Antoine Mauroy's death, a case was formed on April 17, 1668, and presented to the Court of Grand Châtelet. Denys was convinced that his transfusions were not causative of Mauroy's death, and that this trial was rather a consequence of his decision to pursue research against the will of the King's Academy of Sciences as well as that of the major players of the conservative Parisienne Faculty of Medicine.

In an attempt to prove his innocence, Denys told Commissioner Le Cerf his story. He described his medical experiments and explained their safety, which was proved by the many survivors willing to witness in his favor. Finding sufficient grounds for concern, La Cerf forwarded the case to the Criminal Lieutenant, the Honorable Jacques Defita, for a full hearing.

The witnesses at the trial included Perrine Mauroy, Mauroy's late wife, allegedly, persuaded and offered large amounts of money by several "unknown" physicians, to bear false witness and file reports against Denys’ blood transfusion experiments. Following a police investigation, vials with arsenic powder were found in Perrine Mauroy's possession. Arsenic poisoning was known to harm the nervous system and cause symptoms such as tremors, seizures and delirium, this could therefore explain Mauroy's intense delusional behavior prior to the third transfusion. It was therefore suspected that Perrine Mauroy had been administering arsenic powder to her husband's broth.

Judge Defita cleared Denys of all accusations and Perrine was charged and sent to the Grand Châtelets prison. No further investigation was carried out on Perrine's accomplices, people Denys referred to as ‘Enemies of the Experiment’. In addition, the judge ordered that “no transfusion should be made upon any human body but by the approbation of the physicians of the Parisian Faculty (of Medicine)”, forcing Denys to end his studies in blood transfusions.

After the Trial 
After the trial, Denys tried to rebuild his reputation as a transfusionist but the verdict clearly impaired that. Nonetheless, the appeal he made was given full consideration. The only transcript of the hearing we have suggests that the argument made by Denys’ lawyer, Chrétien de Lamoignin, was considered a masterpiece; yet, the whole procedure was surprisingly short followed by no discussion.

The verdict was as expected against the practice of blood transfusion. The judge declared that transfusions could only be performed with the express approval of the Paris Faculty of Medicine, an occurrence remarkably remote.  

Denis returned to his home on the Left Bank, where he gave paid lectures to students as he had done before transfusion made him famous. Four years after the final trial at parliament, the former transfusionist set himself on the most unlikely of research paths: he invented styptic, an antihemorrhagic liquid, now found in medical cabinets all over the world. Denys dies in 1704 at the age of sixty-nine.

Denys’ Haemostatic Solution 
In 1673, a series of experiments presented to the Henry Oldenbourg (1619-1677), secretary of the English Royal Society and editor of Philosophical Transactions, in London, introducing a substance created by Denys, referred to as ‘Liqueur hémostatique’ or ‘Essence de Denys’, supposedly holding anti-hemorrhagic properties. Interest within the medical field grew after accounts of his successful demonstrations were reported in ‘Philosophical Transactions’, a publication by the English Royal Society dating back to mid 1673. Denys claimed that his ‘essence’ was much simpler to use compared to earlier methods of cautery which involved the use of caustic agents such as the ‘needle and thread’ and ‘hot iron’. Denys’ ‘essence’, of which contents are unknown, however, believed to contain a mixture of potassium alum and sulfuric acid , would be applied to arterial and venous wounds in order to staunch the bleeding. Recognizing the effectiveness of the ‘essence’ and foreshadowing the potential usefulness in the English army, Denys received recognition by King Charles II and was invited to stay with him in London appointed as his First Physician, an offer which Denys declined in order to return to Paris in November 1673. This was probably the last mention of the ‘essence’ ever since.

The first fully documented experiment using Denys’ blood staunching liquor was carried out on May 30, 1673 in London by English physician Walter Needham and surgeon Richard Wiseman. In an attempt to demonstrate the effectiveness of the ‘essence’, Needham cut open a dog's neck exposing the jugular vein and carotid artery, he then applied Denys’ hemostatic liquor to the bleeding vessels and applied pressure using a pledget for 30 minutes. Upon removal of the pledge, free-flowing bleeding was no longer observed - the artery had been staunched. Under the order of King Charles II, the two proceeded to test the liquor on patients at the St. Thomas Hospital in London's Southwark, the same extraordinary results were obtained.

Further reading

References

External links
 Red Gold - Innovators & Pioneers: Jean-Baptiste Denis

1643 births
1704 deaths
17th-century French physicians
18th-century French physicians